Gisela Raquel Mota Ocampo (13 March 1982 – 2 January 2016) was a Mexican politician affiliated with the PRD. As of 2013, she served as plurinominal deputy in the LXII Legislature of the Mexican Congress, representing Morelos. After winning the elections in June 2015, Mota Ocampo became mayor of Temixco on 1 January 2016, serving until her assassination the following day, on 2 January 2016. She was the first female mayor of Temixco.

Personal life
Mota Ocampo was arrested in October 2015 following a vehicle collision in which she was drunk driving. She subsequently assaulted a traffic officer, attempted to avoid payment for damages on the basis of being mayor-elect and insulted several individuals. Videos of this incident went viral in Mexico.

Assassination
On the morning of 2 January 2016, the day following her inauguration as mayor, at least four armed men entered her home in Pueblo Viejo, where they shot and killed Mota Ocampo in the doorway. Moments later, the police pursued and killed two of the gunmen and arrested the other two.

Following Mota Ocampo's death, Morelos Governor Graco Ramírez called for three days of mourning in the state and ordered all flags in state buildings to be lowered to half-mast. Ramírez also ordered heightened security among all of the state's mayors.

Mota Ocampo's murderers were believed to be connected to a drugs cartel called Los Rojos, because she refused to allow the gang to operate within her jurisdiction.

See also

 List of people from Morelos, Mexico

References

1982 births
2016 deaths
Deaths by firearm in Mexico
Municipal presidents in Morelos
Members of the Chamber of Deputies (Mexico) for Morelos
Women members of the Chamber of Deputies (Mexico)
Party of the Democratic Revolution politicians
Politicians from Morelos
Politicians killed in the Mexican Drug War
21st-century Mexican politicians
Women mayors of places in Mexico
People murdered in Mexico
21st-century Mexican women politicians
People from Temixco
Deputies of the LXII Legislature of Mexico